You might be looking for:
 Pure (programming language)
 Language purism
 Adamic language